Thirlage was a feudal servitude (or astriction) under Scots law restricting manorial tenants in the milling of their grain for personal or other uses. Vassals in a feudal barony were thirled to their local mill owned by the feudal superior. People so thirled were called suckeners and were obliged to pay customary dues for use of the mill and help maintain it.

Background
The term thirlage is a metathesis of Scots thrillage 'thralldom', derived from thril 'thrall', which was a body servant, retainer, or vassal to a noble or chief. The term is interchangeable with Scots carl (or English churl) and indicates subservience to the feudal superior and feudal laws, the situation being not that far removed from the conditions of slavery.

The obligations of thirlage eventually ceased to apply, but thirlage in Scotland was only formally and totally abolished on 28 November (Martinmas) 2004 by the Abolition of Feudal Tenure etc. (Scotland) Act 2000.

An identical feudal astriction existed and was enforced actively in feudal western Europe, e.g. mill soke in England,  in France,  in the Netherlands,  in Germany.

Thirlage was the feudal law by which the laird (superior) could force all those vassals living on his lands to bring their grain to his mill to be ground. The law ensured that all the grain the vassals produced could be measured and thus taxed. Vassals had to carry out repairs on the mill, maintaining the lade and weir as well as conveying new millstones to the site. Such trees as beech and particularly hornbeam were grown as a crop to provide the necessary wood for the mill machinery.

The Thirlage Act was repealed in 1779 and after this many mills fell out of use as competition and unsubsidised running costs took their toll. This explains why so many mills ceased to be marked on maps after this date. Lambroch Mill for example was on the Annick Water near Stewarton in Ayrshire and apart from the weir and some other indications, it has entirely vanished, most likely because it was the thirlage mill for Lambroughton and its business went to Lainshaw or Cunninghamhead mill after the Thirlage Act was repealed.

Sucken

The 'sucken' was the area over which a mill held thirlage over tenants and a 'suckener' (or 'in-sucken multurer') was a tenant thirled to a particular mill. The millers were obliged to enforce the adherence of tenants to the thirlage laws, since the income of the miller was based on that portion of the tenants' grain that the miller was legally entitled to take for the act of milling the grain. The legal term 'astricted' was applied to a tenant who was thirled or bonded to a particular mill. The term outsucken was applied to a mill which ground corn from outside its sucken for whatever reason.

Multure

Multure (or mulcture), pronounced 'mooter', was the name for the mill toll: a fixed proportion of the tenant's grain, paid to the miller by the suckener to grind the corn. The term 'dry multure' was often used, indicating the multure that a tenant had to pay, whether the grain was to be ground or not. Failure to take grain to the thirled mill was termed 'abstracted multure' and could result in the suckener being fined. The term 'bannock' denoted the payment to a miller's servant amounting to a handful of meal, in addition to that given as knaveship, this being a handful of cereal from each load milled. After the abolition of thirlage the term 'lick of goodwill' or 'lock' was the term for the miller's payment for grinding the cereal, etc.

Aiton records in 1811 that barley, wheat, peas, beans, and every form of green crop were exempt from multure.

Grassum

This was the payment, amounting to a year's rent, for a miller to enter into rights under the law of thirlage. This was a significant sum, and the miller was often forced to insist on his rights of multure to make a reasonable living. By 1811 grassum was almost unknown in Ayrshire.

Dishonesty

The Scots term mill-bitch was used for a bag hung near the millstones into which a dishonest miller would slip a handful of meal now and then. The 'mill-ring' is the space between the millstones and the wooden frame. This space inevitably collected meal and was enlarged by unscrupulous millers to increase the amount that accumulated to their benefit. The term 'ring the mill' was used in common discourse to mean a 'cheat'.

Quern-stones

The legal requirement in Scotland for tenants to use the baron's mill meant that early leases of mills gave to the miller the legal right to break quern-stones which were being used in defiance of thirlage agreements. Many quern-stones are found in a broken condition, maybe having been broken purposely according to thirlage law.

The 1799 Thirlage Act 
The Act allowed those suckeners bound by thirlage to make a one-off payment that 'bought' them out of the various legal requirements:

Section 55 of the Abolition of Feudal Tenure etc. (Scotland) Act 2000 abolished the last vestiges of thirlage as of 28 November 2004.

Transporting millstones 
Under thirlage the suckeners had to convey new millstones to their thirled mill, sometimes over significant distances. The width of some of the first roads was determined by the requirement to have at least two people on either side of a new grindstone being transported, with a wooden axle called a 'mill-wand' passed through the hole in the centre.

Aid to the poor 
Suckeners would place a small amount of grain in a bag at the mill which would be used to help feed the poor or those suffering hard times.

See also
List of Acts of the Parliament of Great Britain, 1780–1800 
Museum of Ayrshire Country Life and Costume

References

External links
A Researcher's Guide to Local History terminology

Feudalism in the British Isles